{{Infobox Public transit
| name = Vienna Transit GmbH & Co KG
| image = Logo-wiener-linien.svg
| caption = 
| imagesize = 250px
| image2 = 4trams vienna.jpg
| imagesize2 = 250px
| locale = Vienna, Austria
| system_length =  bus tram subway<ref name=Jahresbericht_2010>'Zahlen, Daten, Fakten - Jahresbericht 2018 July 2020 (pdf, German), p. 4.</ref>
| transit_type = Bus, tram, and subway
| began_operation = 1999, previously Wiener Stadtwerke – Verkehrsbetriebe| lines = 162 lines(129 bus, 28 tram, 5 subway)
| stations = 5390 stations1,051 tram,109 subway, 4230 bus
| annual_ridership = 965,9 million (2018)463,1 million subway (2018)305,5 million tram (2018)197,3 million bus (2018)
| chief_executive = Günter Steinbauer (CEO)
| headquarters = Erdbergstraße 202, 1030 Wien
| website = www.wienerlinien.at
| operator = Wiener Stadtwerke Holding AG
| vehicles = 447 buses, 485 trams, 768 subway
| alt = 
| owner = 
| area served = 
| line_number = 
| start = 
| end = 
| character = 
| map = 
| map_state = 
| caption2 = Four generations of Wiener Linien trams at Breitensee Depot
}}
Wiener Linien (Viennese Lines) is the company running most of the public transit network in the city of Vienna, Austria. It is part of the city corporation Wiener Stadtwerke Holding AG.

 Governing structure and statistics 
Until decentralisation on 11 June 1999, Wiener Linien was Wiener Stadtwerke – Verkehrsbetriebe, a directly administered subsidiary of the Vienna city government as they had been for over a hundred years. They are still under city control as part of the responsibilities of the City Administrator for Finance, Economics, Work, International affairs and Wiener Stadtwerke, currently Peter Hanke.

As of 2009, Wiener Linien employ approximately 8,000 people and serve approximately 812 million passengers. Ridership numbers have climbed since the 1970s and now exceeds those of 2005 by approximately 60 million. The number of annual season ticket holders has risen to a new record of 334,577, of whom approximately one third are seniors. 24% of all passengers are schoolchildren. Sales rose slightly in 2004 to €345.2. According to surveys, 36% of all journeys in Vienna are completed using public transport, which puts the city in first place in Europe.

Passengers are represented by a Passenger Advisory Council and can make suggestions for improvements. Council members serve four-year terms.

 Transit network (as of 2007) 

Wiener Linien operate bus and tram (Straßenbahn) surface routes, and partly underground, partly overground metro or underground train lines (Vienna U-Bahn).

The U-Bahn network is being steadily expanded, and to a lesser extent the bus routes, especially in outlying areas of the city.

 5 U-Bahn lines with  gross length ( operational length,  built length,  of rail) and 476.7 million passengers (approximately 50 million more than in 2004)
 28 tram lines with  gross length ( operational length,  built length) and 200.4 million passengers (approximately 7 million fewer than in 2004)
 43 daytime bus routes and 23 night bus routes with a total of  gross length and 116 million passengers (exactly 5 million more than in 2004)

The system is supplemented by 26 bus routes operated by subcontractors who also operate their own routes in and around Vienna. In addition there are 7 routes of Demand responsive transport. Wiener Linien services also connect to mainline ÖBB trains and the Vienna S-Bahn.

Most daytime services run between 5:00 am and 0:30 am. During rush hours, many routes run at intervals of two to five minutes; during evening hours, the U-Bahn runs at 7 and a half minute intervals and trams and buses every ten or 15 minutes. Between 0:30 and 5:00 am, night bus routes run every 15 to 30 minutes. Following a February 2010 plebiscite, nighttime U-Bahn service on weekends at 15-minute intervals is to be instituted in September 2010.Webseite der Wiener Linien: Die 24-Stunden-U-Bahn im Jahr 2010 in 37 Nächten unterwegs (24-hour underground in operation for 2010 in 37 days - German), Wiener Linien, retrieved 22 June 2010.

Wiener Linien fares are integrated into the VOR (Verkehrsverbund Ost-Region, East Region Transportation Association); their routes all lie within its core zone (Zone 100). Schoolchildren, students, the unemployed, and pensioners are served at considerably reduced prices.

 U-Bahn 

The Vienna U-Bahn has existed under this name since 1976, when the stretch of the 1898–1901 Vienna Stadtbahn (Vienna Metropolitan Railway) between Heiligenstadt and Friedensbrücke stations was experimentally adapted and placed in operation as Line U4. The construction of a metro in Vienna had been preceded by decades of political debate, since the Social Democratic majority in Vienna had initially preferred other modes of transit. The first stretch of newly constructed U-Bahn rail was placed in operation in 1978 (U1 from Reumannplatz to Karlsplatz).
 Oberlaa–Leopoldau (extension southwards from Reumannplatz to Oberlaa opened in September 2017)
 Seestadt–Karlsplatz (expansion eastwards from Stadion to Aspernstrasse opened in October 2010; further extension from Aspernstrasse to Seestadt opened in October 2013)
 Ottakring–Simmering
 Hütteldorf–Heiligenstadt (expansion from Hütteldorf westwards under discussion)
 Siebenhirten-Floridsdorf (expansion from Floridsdorf northwards under discussion)

 Trams 

The Wiener Straßenbahn (Vienna tramway) has existed since 1865, when the first horsedrawn tram went into service; the first line was electrified in 1897. Originally operated by private transport firms, the tramway was purchased by the city government around 1900 and in the years that followed massively expanded under the name Gemeinde Wien - Städtische Straßenbahnen (Municipality of Vienna - City Tramways). Electrified at the city's expense, the trams were integrated into the transport network in 1925. Until construction of the U-Bahn, the trams were the primary mode of public transport in Vienna.

After 1945, numerous tram lines were abandoned because of increasing use of private cars or converted to bus routes because of economic unviability. Beginning in 1978, in the course of construction of the U-Bahn, tram routes parallelling U-Bahn routes were introduced. Further cutbacks are expected in the next few years as the U-Bahn continues to expand; however, extensions and new lines are also planned, above all in the 21st and 22nd districts.

 Buses 

The Municipality of Vienna has operated bus lines since the 1920s; they increased in importance after suburban development increased demand for transport connections and after many tram lines in densely built-up areas were replaced by bus service.

Vienna Linien bus routes are designated with A (for Autobus) or B (for Bus'') to distinguish them at a glance from tram routes. About 55% of daytime bus routes are operated by sub-contractors on behalf of the Wiener Linien.

Criticism 
In 2005, Wiener Linien received the negative Big Brother Award in the People's Choice category because of camera surveillance.

References

External links 

 
 Tram Travels: Wiener Linien
 Wiener Linien Fanpage: news, forum, photo gallery 
 A tour with tram 1 in Vienna Austria (Video tour of the Vienna Ring Road)

Transport in Vienna
Public transport operators
Companies based in Vienna